Olly Simpson (born 10 January 1998 in Adelaide) is an Australian motorcycle racer. From 2013 to 2015 he was a competitor of the Red Bull MotoGP Rookies Cup.

Career statistics

Grand Prix motorcycle racing

By season

Races by year

References

External links
Profile on MotoGP.com

1998 births
Living people
Australian motorcycle racers
Moto3 World Championship riders